Vittorio Seghezzi (27 May 1924 – 25 October 2019) was an Italian racing cyclist. He finished in last place in the 1948 Tour de France.

References

External links
 

1924 births
2019 deaths
Italian male cyclists
People from Romano di Lombardia
Cyclists from the Province of Bergamo